Wise & Otherwise: A Salute to Life is a non-fiction book written by Sudha Murthy, chairperson of the Infosys Foundation and the wife of Narayan Murthy. It was published by East West Books Pvt. Ltd (Madras) in the year 2002 and a revised edition is first published by Penguin Books with an addition of an extra chapter in the year 2006.  The book shows encounters Sudha Murthy has had with ordinary people and  extraordinary minds during her travels and personal experiences.

Plot
Fifty vignettes showcase the myriad shades of human nature. Contents in the book include stories ranging from a man who dumps his aged father in an old-age home after declaring him to be a homeless stranger; a tribal chief in the Sahyadri hills who teaches the author that there is humility in receiving too and how a sick woman remembers to thank her benefactor even from her deathbed.

References

Indian biographies